Carletonville may refer to:

Carletonville, Gauteng, a town in South Africa
Carletonville, Michigan, a former town in Michigan, US
Carletonville, Ohio, an unincorporated community